The Shadow Secretary of State for Child Poverty was a position in the United Kingdom's Shadow Cabinet that was created on 9 May 2021 by the Leader of the Opposition, Keir Starmer during a cabinet reshuffle. The position was abolished in the November 2021 reshuffle.

List of Shadow Secretaries of State for Child Poverty

See also
 Official Opposition frontbench

References

Official Opposition (United Kingdom)
Child poverty